Route 334 is a Connecticut state highway in the Naugatuck River valley, running from Seymour to Ansonia.

Route description
Route 334 begins at an intersection with Route 188 near the Seymour-Oxford town line and heads southeast.  As it approaches the Seymour-Derby town line, it turns northeast past the Fountain Lake Reservoir and briefly along the Seymour-Ansonia turn line before crossing into Ansonia.  In Ansonia, it intersects Route 8 and turns south and southeast, crossing the Naugatuck River before ending at an intersection with Route 115 near the Ansonia railroad station.

History
As part of the 1962 Route Reclassification Act, Great Hill Road in Ansonia and Seymour was taken over by the state and designated as SR 734. With the opening of the Route 8 expressway, the old surface alignment of Route 8 in Derby and Seymour was designated as SR 735 in 1960. In the 1962 Route Reclassification, most of this had been turned over to the towns. SR 735 was reconfigured to instead follow Franklin Street towards downtown Ansonia instead. Route 334 was commissioned 1963 from SR 734 and the reconfigured SR 735 and has had no significant changes since.

Junction list

References

External links

334
Transportation in New Haven County, Connecticut